Franc Noir de la Haute-Saône is a traditional French variety of red wine grape that is a sibling of Chardonnay. It makes thin, tart wine and has largely disappeared from cultivation.

History
DNA fingerprinting has shown that it is one of many grapes to be the result of a cross between Gouais blanc (Heunisch) and Pinot, making it a full sibling of famous varieties such as Chardonnay and Aligoté. Gouais blanc was widely grown by the French peasantry in the Medieval ages.

Other Gouais blanc/Pinot crosses include Aubin vert, Auxerrois, Bachet noir, Beaunoir, Gamay Blanc Gloriod, Gamay noir, Melon, Knipperlé, Peurion, Romorantin, Roublot, and Sacy

Viticulture
Franc Noir de la Haute-Saône is a vigorous vine, producing small compact bunches of grapes.

Wine regions
As the name suggests, Franc Noir de la Haute-Saône is grown in the area north of Burgundy, but like Bachet noir and Beaunoir, it is dying out.

Synonyms
Franc Noir De Cendrecourt, Franc Noir De Gy, Franc Noir De Jussey, Franc Noir De Venere, Gougenot, Gougenot Saône, Plant Jacquot

References

External links
 VIVC Bibliography

Grape varieties of France